China competed at the 2011 World Aquatics Championships in Shanghai, China between July 16 and 31, 2011.

Medalists

Diving

China has 15 qualified athletes in diving. 

Men

Women

Open water swimming

Men

Women

Mixed

Swimming

China qualified 45 swimmers.

Men
22 swimmers

 * raced in heats only

Women
23 swimmers

 * raced in heats only

Synchronised swimming

China has qualified 12 athletes in synchronised swimming.

Women

Water polo

Men

Team Roster 

Ge Weiqing
Tan Feihu
Liang Zhongxing
Yu Lijun
Guo Junliang
Pan Ning
Li Bin – Captain
Wang Yang
Xie Junmin
Li Li
Zhang Chufeng
Dong Tianyi
Wu Honghui

Group B

Classification 13–16

Fifteenth place game

Women

Team Roster

Jun Yang
Fei Teng – Captain
Liu Ping
Yujun Sun
Jin He
Yating Sun
Donglun Song
Yuan Chen
Yi Wang
Huanhuan Ma
Huizi Sun
Lei Zhang
Ying Wang

Group D

Playoff round

Quarterfinals

Semifinals

Gold medal game

References

Nations at the 2011 World Aquatics Championships
2011 in Chinese sport
China at the World Aquatics Championships